The tubal tonsil, also known as Gerlach tonsil, is one of the four main tonsil groups forming Waldeyer's tonsillar ring.

Structure 
Each tubal tonsil is located posterior to the opening of the Eustachian tube on the lateral wall of the nasopharynx. It is one of the four main tonsil groups forming Waldeyer's tonsillar ring. This ring also includes the palatine tonsils, the lingual tonsils, and the adenoid.

Clinical significance 
The tubal tonsil may be affected by tonsillitis. However, this usually affects only the palatine tonsils.

History 
The tubal tonsil may also be known as the Gerlach tonsil. It is very close to the torus tubarius, which is why this tonsil is sometimes also called the tonsil of (the) torus tubarius. Equating the torus with its tonsil however might be seen as incorrect or imprecise.

References 

Lymphatics of the head and neck
Tonsil